The Ohio State Buckeyes men's volleyball is one of the 18 men's varsity teams at Ohio State University in Columbus, Ohio. The team is coached by Kevin Burch, who is in his first season as head coach. The Buckeyes are a charter member of the Midwest Intercollegiate Volleyball Association (MIVA), which they have been competing in since their founding in 1968. The team has won 27 regular season MIVA titles, 17 tournament titles and three NCAA men's volleyball tournament titles. They currently host their home matches at the Covelli Center on campus.

Arena 
The Buckeyes play their home matches at the Covelli Center on campus. They began playing at the arena in 2020, after having spent more than 50 season at St. John Arena. Their first match at the Covelli Center was played on January 4, 2020, against North Greenville University, which they won 3–0 (25–17, 27–25, 25–19). The game was attended by 1,169 fans.

Ohio State will play host to the NCAA men's volleyball tournament in 2021 at the Covelli Center. They previously hosted the tournament in 1978, 1983, 1997, 2007, and 2017 in St. John Arena.

Seasons 

 1969: In only their second year, the Buckeyes finished a perfect 24–0, claiming their first conference title.
 1975: Ohio State made their first NCAA Tournament appearance after going 19–2. They lost to UCLA in four sets before beating Yale to claim third place.
 1977: The Buckeyes finally made the NCAA Tournament Finals by defeating Pepperdine in four sets. They went on to fall to USC to claim National Runner-up.  
 2011: After 16 previous attempts, the Buckeyes finally claimed their first National Title by defeating Penn State and UC Santa Barbara.
 2016: By winning three games, the Buckeyes won their second title. They defeated George Mason, UCLA, and BYU.  Miles Johnson was named the Most Outstanding Player for the tournament. 
 2017: In front of a home crowd, the Buckeyes won their second straight, and third overall National Championship. They defeated Hawaii and BYU in the tournament. Nicolas Szerszen was named Most Outstanding Player.

Yearly records 
{| class="wikitable"

|- align="center"

Coaches

References

External links
Official website

 
1968 establishments in Ohio
Volleyball clubs established in 1968